The Kyrgyzstan national under-17 football team is the under-17 football (soccer) team of Kyrgyzstan and is controlled by the Football Federation of the Kyrgyz Republic.

Competitive record

FIFA U-17 World Cup record

For 1985 to 1991 see Soviet Union national under-16 football team.

AFC U-16 Championship record

Recent results and fixtures

u17
Asian national under-17 association football teams